Events from the year 1897 in Sweden

Incumbents
 Monarch – Oscar II
 Prime Minister – Erik Gustaf Boström.

Events

 The General Art and Industrial Exposition of Stockholm
 The Swedish Transport Workers' Union was founded.
 Sturehof is opened.
 Elsa Eschelsson become the first female with a Doctor of Laws in Sweden.
 Märtha Leth becomes the first formally educated and licensed female pharmacist in Sweden.

Sport
IFK Eskilstuna founded 
Göteborgs FF founded
Hammarby IF Bandy founded
IFK Norrköping founded

Births

 22 March – Carl Munters, inventor (died 1989)
 30 March – Martin Hindorff, sailor (died 1969).
 18 April – Per-Erik Hedlund, cross country skier (died 1975).
 5 July – Åke Häger, gymnast (died 1968).
 17 August – Erik Charpentier, gymnast (died 1978).

Deaths
 30 January – Robert Themptander, prime minister (born 1844)
 12 September - Fredrika Limnell, salonnière, philanthropist, women's rights activist  (born 1816)
 14 December  - Edvard Swartz, stage actor (born 1826)

References

 
Sweden
Years of the 19th century in Sweden